Bosellia is a genus of sea slugs, marine gastropod mollusks within the superfamily Plakobranchoidea.

Bosellia is the only genus in the family Boselliidae. Such families are monotypic families and this family has no subfamilies.

Distribution 
Distribution include warm waters in Mediterranean and in Atlantic ocean. Reports from Indo-Pacific were not confirmed.

Species 
Species within the genus Bosellia include 3 species and one with uncertain taxonomic status:
 Bosellia cohellia Marcus, 1978 - uncertain taxonomic status
 Bosellia curasoae Er. Marcus & Ev. Marcus, 1970
 Bosellia corinneae Marcus, 1973
 Bosellia levis Fernandez-Ovies & Ortea, 1986
 Bosellia mimetica Trinchese, 1890
Species brought into synonymy
 Bosellia leve Fernández-Ovies & Ortea, 1986: synonym of Bosellia levis Fernandez-Ovies & Ortea, 1986
 Bosellia marcusi Ev. Marcus, 1972: synonym of Elysia marcusi (Ev. Marcus, 1972)

Phylogenetic results by Händeler et al. (2009) indicate that the Caribbean "Bosellia marcusi" described by Eveline Agnes du Bois-Reymond Marcus (1972) is a derived species of Elysia. Morphological examination indicates that the parapodia of "B. marcusi" have secondarily fused over the dorsum, producing a superficial similarity with Bosellia. Bosellia marcusi Marcus, 1972 is a synonym for Elysia marcusi (Marcus, 1972).

References
This article incorporates CC-BY-2.0 text from reference.

Further reading 
 

Boselliidae